The following lists events that happened during 2014 in the Central African Republic.

Incumbents
 President: Michel Djotodia (until 23 January), Catherine Samba-Panza (acting) (starting 23 January)
 Prime Minister: 
 until 10 January: Nicolas Tiangaye
 25 January-10 August: André Nzapayeké (acting)
 starting 10 August: Mahamat Kamoun (acting)

Events

January
 January 10 - Amidst pressure for failing to resolve ongoing conflict, President of the Central African Republic Michel Djotodia resigns nine months after Séléka toppled François Bozizé. Alexandre-Ferdinand Nguendet becomes acting president.
 January 11 - African migrants are to be evacuated as violence continues in the Central African Republic.
 January 20 - The transitional National Assembly of the Central African Republic chooses Catherine Samba-Panza as the interim President, making her the country's first female head of state.
 January 23 - Catherine Samba-Panza assumed office as the Head of State of the Transition of the Central African Republic.
 January 25 - André Nzapayeké assumed office as Acting Prime Minister.

February
 February 14 - Several massacres were committed by Anti-balaka against Muslim civilians. This forced thousands of Muslims to flee the country.

April
Militia attacked a convoy of Chadian troops and Muslims. Around 700 people were displaced.

See also
Central African Republic 2013-14 Events
History of the Central African Republic

Notes
Central African Republic was under conflict with the Djotodia administration from April 2013 to January 10, 2014.

References

External links
Central African Republic Public Holidays 2014 (Africa)
2014 Central African Republic Public Holidays Calendar -- Timebie

 
Years of the 21st century in the Central African Republic
Central African Republic
2010s in the Central African Republic
Central African Republic